Henry Whitefield was the Archdeacon of Barnstaple from 1371 to 1384.

References

Archdeacons of Barnstaple